Baghini is a 1968 Bengali drama film directed by Bijay Bose and produced by Girindra Singha. The movie is based on a same name novel of Samaresh Basu. Soumitra Chatterjee stars as the main hero, Chiranjib, and Sandhya Roy plays the film's heroine, Dugga. Jahar Roy plays Dugga's father, a liquor merchant; Rabi Ghosh plays Bhola, the villain. In the end, Bhola is killed by Dugga. She marries Chiranjib before going to jail.

Cast
 Soumitra Chatterjee as Chiranjib
 Sandhya Roy as Dugga
 Rabi Ghosh as Bhola
 Jahor Roy as Dugga's father
 Bhanu Bandopadhyay
 Chhaya Devi
 Basabi Nandi
 Ruma Guha Thakurta
 Bikash Roy
 Raakhee as Rakhee Biswas
 Sukhen Das
 Nimu Bhowmik

Soundtrack

References

External links

1968 films
Bengali-language Indian films
1960s Bengali-language films
Indian drama films
Films based on Indian novels
Films based on works by Samaresh Basu